Vladimir Tufegdžić (Serbian Cyrillic: Владимир Туфегџић; born 12 June 1991) is a Serbian football forward who plays for Vestri.

Club career
Tufegdžić also played in Iceland for Víkingur Reykjavík,  KA Akureyri and Grindavík.

References

External links
 
 Vladimir Tufegdžić stats at utakmica.rs 
 

1991 births
Living people
Sportspeople from Kraljevo
Association football forwards
Serbian footballers
FK Mačva Šabac players
RFK Novi Sad 1921 players
OFK Beograd players
FK Voždovac players
FK Donji Srem players
FK Sinđelić Beograd players
FK Sloga Petrovac na Mlavi players
FK Zemun players
Knattspyrnufélagið Víkingur players
Knattspyrnufélag Akureyrar players
Grindavík men's football players
Vestri (football club) players
Serbian First League players
Serbian SuperLiga players
Úrvalsdeild karla (football) players
1. deild karla players
Serbian expatriate footballers
Expatriate footballers in Iceland
Serbian expatriate sportspeople in Iceland